Sheikhupura also known as Qila Sheikhupura, is a city in the Pakistani province of Punjab. Founded by the Mughal Emperor Jehangir in 1607, Sheikhupura is the 16th largest city of Pakistan by population and is the headquarters of Sheikhupura District. The city is an industrial center, and satellite town, located about 38 km northwest of Lahore. It is also connected to District Kasur.

The old name of Sheikhupura was “Virkgarh” due to large number of Virk Jats settled in the area. The Virks are still strong in this area both politically and economically. There are around 132 villages in this area which belong to the Virks.

Etymology 
The region around Sheikhupura was previous known as Virk Garh, or "Virk Fort", in reference to the Jat tribe that inhabited the area. The city, founded in 1607, was named by Mughal Emperor Jehangir himself - the city's first name is recorded in the Emperor's autobiography, the Tuzk-e-Jahangiri, in which he refers to the town as Jehangir pura. The city then came to be known by its current name, which derives from Jehangir's nickname Shekhu that was given to him by his mother, wife of Akbar the Great.

History

Mughal 
Mughal Emperor Jahangir laid the foundations of Sheikhupura in 1607 near the older town of Jandiala Sher Khan, an important provincial town during the early to middle Mughal era. He also erected the nearby Hiran Minar, Sheikhpura's most renowned site, between 1607 and 1620 as a monument to his beloved pet deer, Mansiraj, at a time when the area served as a royal hunting ground for the Mughal Emperor. Jehangir laid the foundation of the Sheikhupura Fort in 1607, which is situated in the city's centre.

British 
Following establishment of British colonial rule, Bhatti possessions that had been seized by the Sikhs were restored. The large area between the Chenab and Ravi rivers were initially consolidated into a single district with Sheikhupura serving as its first headquarters, until 1851. The area around Sheikhupura attained District status in 1919, with M.M.L. Karry serving as its first administrator.

Partition 
On the eve of the Partition of British India, Sikhs made up 19% of the district's population. Despite the area's Muslim majority, Sikhs had hoped that the boundary commission would award the area to India, given the proximity of Sheikhupura to the city of Nankana Sahib - revered as the birthplace of the founder of Sikhism, Guru Nanak. The city was spared the large-scale rioting that engulfed Lahore earlier in 1947, and the city's Sikh population did not shift to India before the Radcliffe Line that demarcated the border of the newly independent states of Pakistan and India was announced.

The Sikh population had not made arrangements to leave and remained trapped in the city until 31 August 1947. The city's Sacha Sauda refugee camp hosted upwards of 100,000 Sikh refugees who had come to the city after fleeing nearby Gujranwala and other surrounding areas earlier that year. Fierce violence erupted in the city, and an estimated 10,000 people were killed in Sheikhupura between 16 August and 31 August in communal rioting between Sikhs and Muslims.

Education
The overall literacy rate of Sheikhupura is 43.6% which is increasing day by day. Following are some of the notable educational institutes of the city:
Hajvery University, Sheikhupura Campus
University of Central Punjab, Sheikhupura Campus
Punjab College of Science
The Superior College
Lahore Grammar School
Beaconhouse School System
The City School
Overseas Pakistanis Foundation

Demographics
According to the 1998 Pakistan Census, the population of Sheikhupura city was recorded as 280,263. As per 2017 Census of Pakistan, the population of city was recorded as 473,129 with an increase of 68.82% in just 19 years.

Industrial areas
Quaid-e-Azam Business Park Sheikhupura and Rachna Industrial Park are two industrial areas under development in Sheikhupura. The former industrial area is declared a special economic zone by the government of Pakistan.

Modern neighborhood of city
Sheikhupura is an old city having pre-British history however keeping in view of industrialization & growth, several housing societies & towns have been built in & around the city boundaries.Few prominent towns are e community housing society, new civil lines & wapda Town sheikhupura.

Notable people
Sher Akbar Khan, MPA PP 142 Pakistan Tehreek e Insaf, Pakistani politician
 Aaqib Javed played as fast bowler for Pakistan cricket team
 Anjum Saeed played one Olympics for Pakistan hockey team
 Hakim Ali Virk, Council member and Chairman UC, 284 RB
 Choudhry Bilal Ahmed, politician
 Ghulam Jilani Khan is the founder of the Chand Bagh School 
 Kulwant Singh Virk, author
 javed latif,is a politician. 
 Mohammad Asif a right arm medium fast bowler in cricket
 Muhammad Javed Buttar, is a former justice of Supreme Court of Pakistan
 Muhammad Nawaz Bhatti, judge and lawyer
 Nawab Kapur Singh, one of the pivotal figures of the Sikh Confederacy and founder of the Singhpuria Misl
 Rana Naved-ul-Hasan, player for the Pakistan National Cricket Team
 Rana Tanveer Hussain Federal Minister
 Saeed Anwar played three Olympics for Pakistan hockey team
 Sheikh Salim Chishti, Sufi saint of the Chishti Order during the Mughal Empire
 Waris Shah, A Great Punjabi Sufi Poet 
 Zaka Ullah Bhangoo, Pakistani army aviator
 Zia Ullah Khan is attributed with major contributions in the military such as serving as Corps Commander of XII Corps Quetta<ref>'XII Corps (Pakistan)' 
 Zulfiqar Ahmad Dhillon, retired brigadier in the Pakistani army
 Saith Onain Asif, Pakistani Prime Minister
 Gulshan Bawra, Indian songwriter

See also
 Hiran Minar, minaret built in the early 17th century
 Sheikhupura Stadium
 Old City
 Qazi Park
 Bhatti Chock
Sharaqpur Sharif
Farooqabad
Kot Abdul Malik
Quaid-e-Azam Business Park Sheikhupura
Deg outfall hydropower project Sheikhupura

References

External links

Official Website of Punjab Government

 
Education in Sheikhupura
Populated places in Sheikhupura District